Citer may refer to:

CITER 155mm L33 Gun, artillery gun used by the Argentine Army
Citer, French car rental company
Citers, French village and commune